In-Gear Film Production Co., Ltd., or In-Gear Film, was a Hong Kong production company that was established by actor/film producer Alan Tang in 1987.

In-Gear has produced a number of films that Tang has either starred in or produced. This includes films such as Gun n' Rose, Return Engagement, The Black Panther Warriors and Flaming Brothers.

External links
 Alan Tang-Romancing the Chinese Movies

Film production companies of Hong Kong
Cinema of Hong Kong
Entertainment companies established in 1987